Caustic Window (also known as Caustic Window LP) is an album by Richard D. James under the alias Caustic Window. Originally planned for release in 1996, only a few test pressings were produced. One of the copies, which surfaced for sale on Discogs in 2014, was bought and digitally distributed through a Kickstarter campaign. It was eventually sold on eBay for $46,300.

Background
Although 2 of the tracks ("Phlaps" and "Cunt") appeared on compilations in the 1990s, the actual Caustic Window album's release was canceled. At least five copies were pressed in 1994. At least one copy was sold through the Record & Tape Exchange in Camden in the late 1990s. One of the copies surfaced on Discogs in 2014, with a price of $13,500. In response, We Are the Music Makers, an electronic music forum, negotiated with Rephlex Records and initiated a Kickstarter project in which backers received a digital copy of the album. More than $47,000 was raised.

After the Kickstarter campaign, the copy was sold on an eBay auction. Money raised from the sale was split evenly between the Kickstarter contributors, Richard D. James and Doctors Without Borders. The copy was bought by Markus "Notch" Persson, the creator of Minecraft, for $46,300.

Critical reception

Mark Richardson of Pitchfork named Caustic Window the week's "best new reissue", and wrote: "Caustic Window LP probably wouldn’t have left a significant mark, and would have been heard as second-tier James. Twenty years later, though, we’re hearing it with that aura, that extra bit of longing that comes from how scarce music from James has become. And in that light, second tier is still very good indeed." Derek Staples of Consequence of Sound wrote that "the greatest gems within this collection highlight James’ foresight into electronic dance music", with "early examples of now trending tech-house ... This release might not have lived up to the lofty standards of the label, yet it remains relevant in a community of constant transition."

Track listing

References

External links
 Caustic Window Kickstarter campaign

1996 albums
2014 albums
Aphex Twin albums
Rephlex Records albums
Kickstarter-funded albums